John DeLancey Ferguson (November 13, 1888 – August 13, 1966) was a writer and academic.

Early life
Ferguson was born at Scottsville, New York in 1888.

Academic career
Ferguson attended Rutgers University, where he achieved a Bachelor of Arts degree in 1911 and Master of Arts in 1912. He then received his PhD from Columbia University.

He began his teaching career at Heidelberg College in 1914. He also taught at Ohio Wesleyan University, Case Western Reserve University and Brooklyn College. Ferguson was a fellow of the Society of Antiquaries of Scotland, a member of the Modern Language Association, and was awarded a Guggenheim Fellowship.

Robert Burns
Ferguson is considered to be one of the foremost scholars of the life and work of Robert Burns. He was appointed as an honorary member of the Irvine Burns Club in 1962.

Death
Ferguson died in 1966 in Connecticut after living with Parkinson's disease.

Publications
 The Relations of the State to Religion in New York and New Jersey during the Colonial Period. New Brunswick: Rutgers College, 1912.
 American literature in Spain. New York: Columbia University Press, 1916.
 Selected Poems of Robert Burns. New York: Macmillan, 1926.
 The Letters of Robert Burns. Vol. 1. Oxford: Clarendon Press, 1931
 Some aspects of the Burns legend (1932)
 Men and Moments: A Book of Living Narratives. New York: Knight, 1938
 Theme and Variation in the Short Story. New York: The Cordon Company, 1938
 Pride and passion: Robert Burns, 1759-1796. New York: Oxford University Press, 1939
 with Robert Tyson Fitzhugh, Robert Burns, His Associates and Contemporaries. Chapel Hill: University of North Carolina Press, 1943.
 Mark Twain, man and legend (1943)
 The Merry Muses of Caledonia. with James Barke and Sydney Goodsir Smith. New York: Putnam, 1959.
 The Poems of Robert Burns. Glasgow: The University Press, 1965

References

Rutgers University alumni
Columbia University alumni
1888 births
1966 deaths
People from Monroe County, New York